Altes Gefängnis (German for "old prison") is a prison in Swakopmund, Namibia. It was constructed in 1909 by the German Empire and designed by German architect Heinrich Bause. The large main building was used to house the prison's staff, while the prisoners themselves were kept in other quarters.

References

External links

Blog with photos of the building by Nelieta Mishchenko

Prisons in Namibia
Buildings and structures in Erongo Region
Swakopmund
Government buildings completed in 1909